Noah Jupe (born ) is a British actor. He is known for his roles in the television series The Night Manager (2016); the dark comedy film Suburbicon (2017); the drama film Wonder (2017); the horror film A Quiet Place (2018) and its sequel A Quiet Place Part II (2021); the sports drama film Ford v Ferrari (2019); the drama film Honey Boy (2019), for which he was nominated for the Independent Spirit Award for Best Supporting Male; and the miniseries The Undoing (2020).

Early life
Noah Jupe was born to filmmaker Chris Jupe and actress Katy Cavanagh. He has a younger sister and a younger brother.

Career
Jupe started his acting career in 2015 by appearing in the television series Penny Dreadful and Downton Abbey. Later in 2016, he played a significant role in the spy thriller series The Night Manager. In 2016, he also played a significant role in the series Houdini & Doyle.

In 2017, he started his career in films, with his first major role being in The Man with the Iron Heart, a World War II drama. Also that year, he appeared in the British film That Good Night; had one of the lead roles in the black comedy film Suburbicon, directed by George Clooney; and appeared in the comedy-drama Wonder as Jack Will, best friend to Auggie Pullman. Also in 2017, he was cast in the short film adaptation of Stephen King's My Pretty Pony.

In 2018, he starred in the science fiction film The Titan, and in the horror film A Quiet Place. John Krasinski, who cowrote and directed A Quiet Place, cast Jupe on Clooney's recommendation.

In 2019, Jupe starred in Honey Boy opposite Shia LaBeouf. The independent film is based on LaBeouf's coming-of-age in the entertainment industry, with Jupe playing the young version of the character based on LaBeouf. That same year, Jupe also starred in the film Ford v Ferrari. In 2020, he starred in the miniseries The Undoing.

Jupe was featured among "The 12 Young Creatives" in British Vogue's March 2021 issue. He reprised his role as Marcus Abbott in A Quiet Place Part II later that year. Jupe will voice Peter in the upcoming animated film The Magician's Elephant. In 2022, it was announced that he had been cast in the sci-fi drama film Morning, directed by Justin Kurzel. Additionally, he was cast to star in Apple TV+'s two miniseries Franklin and Lady in the Lake.

Filmography

Film

Television

Music videos

Awards and nominations

References

External links
 

2000s births
Living people
Year of birth uncertain
Male actors from London
English male child actors
English male film actors
English male television actors
21st-century English male actors